Transcription regulator protein BACH1 is a protein that in humans is encoded by the BACH1 gene.

Function 

This gene encodes a transcription factor that belongs to the cap'n'collar type of basic region leucine zipper factor family (CNC-bZip). The encoded protein contains broad complex, tramtrack, bric-a-brac/poxvirus and zinc finger (BTB/POZ) domains, which is atypical of CNC-bZip family members. These BTB/POZ domains facilitate protein-protein interactions and formation of homo- and/or hetero-oligomers. The C-terminus of the protein is a leucine zipper of the bzip_maf family. When this protein forms a heterodimer with MafK, it functions as a repressor of Maf recognition element (MARE) and transcription is repressed. Multiple alternatively spliced transcript variants have been identified for this gene. Some exons of this gene overlap with some exons from the C21orf41 gene, which is transcribed in an opposite orientation to this gene but does not seem to encode a protein.

See also 
 Small Maf

References

Further reading

External links 
 
 

Transcription factors